The Sirindhorn Dam is in Sirindhorn District, Ubon Ratchatani, Thailand. It impounds the Lam Dom Noi River, and its reservoir is the province's largest water resource. The dam was commissioned in 1971 to serve as a hydropower facility as well as to supply irrigation water. The dam was named after Princess Royal Sirindhorn. All of the electricity generated by the dam is destined for domestic markets. The dam was constructed and is owned and operated by the Electricity Generating Authority of Thailand and is located in the Mekong River Basin, just upstream from the controversial Pak Mun Dam.

Some 2,000 villagers were resettled to make way for the dam's reservoir. Many claim they did not receive adequate compensation for the loss of their livelihood and only received compensation for 80% of their land. Furthermore, they claim that the land in the resettlement village is of poor quality and few crops can be grown, and that a proposed irrigation canal was never built.

The reservoir and dam power the Sirindhorn Hydropower Plant, which has an installed capacity of 3 units of 12,000 kilowatts each and annual energy production of 90 GWh. Floating solar panels were installed in 2021, increasing the power to 45 MW.

There is a park near the dam headquarters and a restaurant and bungalows for visitors. There is a golf course in this area also, at the north end of the lake.

See also

 Mekong
 Mekong River Commission
 Mun River
 Dom Noi River
 Pak Mun Dam

References

External links

CPWF-Mekong
Hydropower Construction Division, Electricity Generating Authority of Thailand
Department of Energy Promotion and Development (EPD), Ministry of Energy and Mines (Lao PDR)
Department of Water Resources (Thailand)
Greater Mekong Sub-region Social Studies Center - 
Thailand National Mekong Committee

Dams in the Mekong River Basin
Dams in Thailand
Hydroelectric power stations in Thailand
Isan
Buildings and structures in Ubon Ratchathani province
Dams completed in 1971
Energy infrastructure completed in 1971
1971 establishments in Thailand